Constance Forslund (born June 19, 1950) is an American actress whose performances include a revival of Clare Boothe Luce's The Women on Broadway and the films The Way We Were and The Great Bank Hoax.

Career 
In television movies, Forslund portrayed Ginger Grant in The Harlem Globetrotters on Gilligan's Island and Marilyn Monroe in This Year's Blonde, one of a series of three movie specials under the "Moviola" name. She also appeared on such television series as Fantasy Island, Taxi, One Day at a Time, Trapper John, M.D., CHiPs, Magnum, P.I., The Love Boat, Murder, She Wrote, It's a Living and ER.

Filmography

Film

Television

References

External links
 

1950 births
Living people
Actresses from San Diego
American film actresses
American stage actresses
American television actresses
20th-century American actresses
21st-century American actresses